The UAE national ice hockey team is the national men's ice hockey team of the United Arab Emirates. It is operated under the UAE Ice Sports Federation and a member of the International Ice Hockey Federation (IIHF). As of 26 May 2019, the UAE is currently ranked 48th in the IIHF World Ranking and competes in Division III Group A tournament of the World Championships.

History
In June 2008, the UAE took part in the inaugural Arab Cup in Abu Dhabi, also involving the national teams of Algeria, Morocco, and Kuwait. They went on to finish first in the standings and won the gold medal after defeating Kuwait, 4–1. They won the gold in the 2009 IIHF Challenge Cup of Asia also in Abu Dhabi.

In 2010, the UAE became the first from an Arab nation to play in the IIHF World Championship when they participated in Division III. Although the UAE was not ranked in the world rankings until they played against Ireland, Luxembourg, and Greece, and finished last in Group A with a record of four losses. Their new head coach was Teemu Taruvuori of Finland. In May 2010, the UAE participated in the Kuwaiti organized GCC Gulf Championship, finishing first after winning all three of their games.

Withdrawal from 2011 and 2016 IIHF tournaments
The UAE decided to withdraw from the 2011 Division III tournament in Cape Town, South Africa because they refused to compete against Israel, who was also in the tournament. They also withdrew from the 2016 Division III tournament, with no reason cited.

Tournament record

World Championships

Asian Winter Games

Arab Cup/GCC Gulf Championship

Challenge Cup of Asia

All-time record against other nations
Last match update: 7 April 2022

Note: The UAE was awarded a 5–0 win over Bosnia and Herzegovina in the 2017 IIHF World Championship Division III after Bosnia and Herzegovina forfeited the game.

See also
 Emirates Ice Hockey League
 Ice hockey in the United Arab Emirates

References

External links

IIHF profile
National Teams of Ice Hockey

Ice hockey in the United Arab Emirates
National ice hockey teams in the Arab world
National ice hockey teams in Asia
Ice hockey